

D
 DA   - Dominion Atlantic Railway; Canadian Pacific Railway
 DACX - Darling and Company; VIP Tank Services
 DAFU - Dafra Lines, SA
 DAFX - United States Department of Defense (Troop Support and Aviation Material Readiness)
 DAFZ - Dafra Lines, SA
 DAIR - D&I Railroad
 DAKR - Dakota Rail
 DAKS - Dakota Short Line
 DAKX - DAK Americas, LLC
 DALT - Dallas Terminal Railway
 DALZ - D and A Leasing, Inc.
 DANX - Dana Railcare
 DAPX - Dairyland Power Cooperative
 DARU - Dart Container Line, Inc.
 DARZ - Dart Intermodal, Inc.
 DATU - Dart Container Line, Inc.
 DATX - DATX Associates
 DAVX - W. R. Grace and Company (Conn. Davison Chemical Division)
 DAWX - D.A. Walmsley and Company
 DAX  - Diamond Shamrock Chemicals Company; Occidental Chemical Corporation
 DBCX - Badische Corporation; BASF Corporation
 DBGX - Dowdle Butane Gas Company
 DBSU - Donbar Steamship Company, Inc.
 DBUX - CIT Equipment Finance Corporation
 DBWX - DB Western, Inc.
 DC   - Delray Connecting Railroad
 DCAX - Tarmac Florida, Inc.
 DCBX - DeGussa Engineered Carbons, LLP
 DCCU - Dow Corning Corporation
 DCCX - McDonnell Douglas Corporation
 DCFX - PLM International, Inc.
 DCI  - Des Moines and Central Iowa
 DCIX - Danella Construction Corporation
 DCLR - Delaware Coast Line Railroad
 DCLU - Dutch Container Leasing, B.V.
 DCLX - Procor Ltd.; Dow Chemical Canada, Inc.
 DCMX - Davidson Construction Materials, Inc.
 DCON - Detroit Connecting Railroad Company
 DCOU - Dow Corning Corporation
 DCPX - Dart Container Corporation of Pennsylvania
 DCR - Delmarva Central Railroad
 DCRR - Dubois County Railroad
 DCSU - Delta Conteneur Service
 DCTX - PLM International
 DD - Dover and Delaware River Railroad
 DDDX - Frontier Cooperative Company
 DDEX - Dupont Dow Elastomers, LLC
 DDNX - Didion, Inc.
 DEBX - Ceres AG Products
 DEEX - Detroit Edison
 DEGX - Mississippi Power Company
 DEMX - Demeter, Inc.
 DEPX - Dependable Properties, Inc.
 DETX - Detroit Edison Company
 DFTX - DTE Transportation Services, Ltd.
 DGBY - Digby Truck Lines
 DGCX - Dakota Gasification Company
 DGHX - North American Chemical Company
 DGIX - D and G Enterprises, LLC
 DGNO - Dallas, Garland and Northeastern Railroad
 DGVR - Durbin and Greenbrier Valley Railroad
 DH   - Delaware and Hudson Railway
 DHNY - Delaware and Hudson Railway
 DHPX - Degussa Corporation
 DHRU - Den Hartogh NV
 DICX - Pure Carbonic Company
 DIIU - Dart Intermodal, Inc.
 DJBX - Gandy Dancer, Inc. (Donald J. Bertel)
 DJJX - David J. Joseph Transportation, Inc.
 DJLX - Joseph Leasing, Ltd.
 DJMX - Daniel John Marnell
 DJPX - David J. Joseph Transportation, Inc.
 DJRX - David J. Joseph Transportation, Inc.
 DJTX - David J. Joseph Transportation, Inc.
 DKPX - Duke Power Company (scale test cars)
 DKS  - Doniphan, Kensett and Searcy Railway; Union Pacific Railroad
 DKUX - Exxon Mobil Corporation
 DL   - Delaware Lackawanna
 DLC  - Drummond Lighterage
 DLCR - Delaware Coast Line Railroad
 DLCX  - Waste Management, Inc.
 DLFX - Diversified Lease Funding, Inc.
 DLGX - Lewis Grain Company
 DLKU - Deltank, Ltd.
 DLMX - Daylight Locomotives and Machine Works, Inc.
 DLNW - Denver, Laramie and North Western Railroad; Great Western Railway of Colorado
 DLPX - DeGussa Canada, Ltd.
 DLRX - GE Railcar Services Corporation
 DLSX - Diesel Supply Company, Inc.
 DLTX - Dale L. Thornborough
 DLVX - Thiokol Corporation
 DLW  - Delaware, Lackawanna and Western Railroad; Erie Lackawanna Railway; Norfolk Southern
 DLWR - Depew, Lancaster and Western Railroad
 DLWX - D.L. and W., Inc.
 DM   - Detroit and Mackinac Railway
 DME  - Dakota, Minnesota and Eastern Railroad
 DMHX - Davenport Mammoet, LLC
 DMIR - Duluth, Missabe and Iron Range Railway
 DMIX - ADM Transportation
 DMLX - GE Railcar Services Corporation
 DMLZ - DML Containers
 DMM  - Dansville and Mount Morris Railroad
 DMU  - Des Moines Union Railway
 DMVW - Dakota, Missouri Valley and Western Railroad
 DNAX - Dana Railcare
 DNE  - Duluth and Northeastern Railroad
 DOCX - Du Pont Canada, Inc.
 DODU - United States Department of Defense
 DODX - United States Department of Defense (Military Traffic Management Command)
 DODZ - United States Department of Defense
 DOEX - Doe Run Resources Corporation
 DOLX - Dolese Brothers Company
 DONX - Donnelly Commodities Company
 DOTX - United States Department of Transportation; Federal Railroad Administration
 DOWU - Dow Chemical Company
 DOWX - Dow Chemical Company
 DPCX - Blue Circle, Inc.
 DPDZ - Delaware and Hudson Railway
 DPGX - Tractech Systems
 DPIX - Dufour Petroleum, Inc.
 DPLX - Davenport Cement Company
 DQE  - De Queen and Eastern Railroad
 DR   - Dardanelle and Russellville Railroad
 DRAX - DRAYCUTT Corporation
 DRCX - Martin Marietta Corporation
 DRDX - The Duredo Company
 DREX - ProTrade Steel Company
 DRG  - Denver and Rio Grande Railroad
 DRGW - Denver and Rio Grande Western Railroad; Southern Pacific Railroad; Union Pacific Railroad
 DRGX - Denver and Royal Gorge Railway
 DRHY - Durham Transport
 DRI  - Davenport, Rock Island and North Western Railway
 DRIR - Denver Rock Island Railroad
 DRMX - Danbury Railway Museum
 DRR  - Delaware and Raritan River Railroad
 DRR  - Disneyland Railroad
 DRRV - Dover and Rockaway River Railroad
 DRSX - D.O.T. Rail Services, Inc.
 DRTU - Dart Intermodal, Inc.
 DRTZ - Dart Intermodal, Inc.
 DSBU - Ameribrom, Inc.
 DSCX - DIFCO, Inc.
 DSDX - Pullman Leasing Company
 DSEX - East Carbon Development Company
 DSIX - Dowell Schlumberger, Inc.
 DSLX - DeGussa Corporation
 DSLZ - Intermodal Services, Inc.
 DSRC - Dakota Southern Railway
 DSRR - Delta Southern Railroad
 DSRX - Downeast Scenic Railroad (and its parent organization, Downeast Rail Heritage Preservation Trust, Inc.)
 DSSA - Duluth, South Shore and Atlantic Railway
 DSSX - Detroit Salt Company, LLC
 DT   - Decatur Junction Railway
 DTCX - DTE Transportation Services, Inc.
 DTEX - Dresser Transportation Equipment (Division of Dresser Industries)
 DTI  - Detroit, Toledo and Ironton Railroad; Grand Trunk Western Railroad; Canadian National Railway
 DTIZ - Grand Trunk Western Railroad; Canadian National Railway
 DTLX - Delta Tank Line Company
 DTRR - Danbury Terminal Railroad; Housatonic Railroad
 DTS  - Detroit and Toledo Shore Line Railroad; Grand Trunk Western Railroad; Canadian National Railway
 DTTX - Trailer Train Corporation; TTX Corporation
 DTZZ - Direct Transit, Inc.
 DUCX - Du Pont Canada, Inc.
 DUFX - Duffy and Sons, Inc.
 DUKX - Dupps Company
 DUPX - DuPont
 DUT  - Denver Union Terminal Railway
 DUTC - Dallas Union Terminal
 DV   - Delaware Valley Railway
 DVLX - Duval Corporation; Freeport-McRo-Ran Sulphur Company
 DVR  - Devco Railway; Cape Breton Development Corporation (Coal Division); Sydney Coal Railway (its successor)
 DVRU - Dover, Ltd.
 DVS  - Delta Valley and Southern Railway
 DVSZ - Delta Valley and Southern Railway
 DVTX - SULCOM, Inc.
 DW   - Detroit and Western
 DWAU - Degussa Antwerpen, NV
 DWC  - Duluth, Winnipeg and Pacific Railway; Canadian National Railway
 DWCX - David Witherspoon, Inc.
 DWML - Due West Motor Line
 DWP  - Duluth, Winnipeg and Pacific Railway; Canadian National Railway
 DYLX - Ronald L. Boothman Remainder Trust; Transportation Equipment
 DYNX - Dyno Nobel, Inc.
 DYRX - Dynamic Rail Preservation Inc.

D